Jim, Jimmy, or Jimmie Wilson may refer to:

Entertainment
 Jimmy Wilson (blues musician) (1918–1966), West Coast blues singer of the 1950s
 Jim Wilson (guitarist), guitar player for rock band Mother Superior and Rollins Band
 Jim Wilson (pianist), American pianist and songwriter
 Jimmie Wilson (singer) (born 1981), American singer
 Jim Wilson (producer), American movie producer
 Jim Wilson (comics), fictional character, friend of the Incredible Hulk and Rick Jones who later dies of AIDS

Politics
 Jim Wilson (California politician) (1872–1956), banker and City Council member
 Jim Wilson (New Brunswick politician) (1937–2005), member of the Legislative Assembly of New Brunswick
 Jim Wilson (Northern Ireland politician) (born 1941), former member of the Northern Ireland Assembly
 Jim Wilson (Oklahoma politician) (born 1947), Oklahoma state senator
 Jim Wilson (Ontario politician) (born 1963), politician in Ontario, Canada

Sports

Baseball
 Jim Wilson (pitcher) (1922–1986), American pitcher in Major League Baseball, 1945–1958
 Jim Wilson (first baseman) (born 1960), American Major League Baseball player
 Jimmie Wilson (baseball) (1900–1947), American baseball player and manager and professional soccer player
 Jimmy Wilson (Negro leagues) (1920–1997), American baseball player

Football
 James B. Wilson (1896–1986), known as Jimmie, American football player and coach
 Jim Wilson (Australian footballer) (born 1930), Australian rules footballer for Melbourne
 Jim Wilson (footballer, born 1945) (born 1945), Scottish footballer
 Jimmy Wilson (American football) (born 1986), American football cornerback
 Jimmy Wilson (footballer, born 1909) (1909–?), British footballer
 Jimmy Wilson (footballer, born 1916) (1916–after 1939), English football inside forward who played for Lincoln City in the 1930s
 Jimmy Wilson (footballer, born 1924) (1924–1987), also known as Tug Wilson, English footballer who played for Watford in the 1950s
 Jimmy Wilson (footballer, born 1942), Scottish footballer
 Jim Wilson (soccer) (fl. 1924), Canadian international soccer player
 Jim Wilson (winger), Scottish footballer for Bolton Wanderers
 Jimmy Wilson (footballer, born 1929) (1929–2017), Scottish footballer for Mansfield Town

Other sports
 Jim Wilson (wrestler) (1942–2009), American football player, professional wrestler
 Jim Wilson (basketball) (born 1948), American professional basketball player
 Jim Wilson (curler), Canadian curler

Other
 Jim Wilson (broadcaster) (born 1968), Australian television and radio presenter
 Jim Richard Wilson (1953–2014), director of the Opalka Gallery
 Jimmy Wilson (robber) (1904–after 1973), African-American farmhand who was convicted of robbery and sentenced to death for stealing $1.95

See also
James Wilson (disambiguation)